The vice president of Somalia is a former political position in Somali Democratic Republic. The vice presidents were appointed on the discretion of the president of Somalia, Mohamed Siad Barre.

A history of the office holder follows.

Somali Democratic Republic

Interim Government of Somalia

References

See also
President of Somalia
Supreme Revolutionary Council (Somalia)

Politics of Somalia
Somalia
Government of Somalia
Vice presidents of Somalia